Jobs for the Girls is a BBC television documentary series in which actors Linda Robson and Pauline Quirke learned about a new profession in each episode. It ran in 1995 for one series of four episodes, followed by a Christmas special.

The show included guest appearances from Ian Botham, Roger Daltrey, Sarah, Duchess of York, and Lesley Garrett.

The theme music was composed by Simon May, and included on his album New Vintage: The Best of Simon May.

Episodes

References

External links

BBC television documentaries